Carlos Macias Arellano (born 3 July 1931) was a Mexican politician affiliated with the Institutional Revolutionary Party. He served as Municipal President of Aguascalientes from 1969 to 1971.

See also
 List of mayors of Aguascalientes

References

1931 births
People from Aguascalientes City
Institutional Revolutionary Party politicians
Living people
20th-century Mexican politicians
Politicians from Aguascalientes
Municipal presidents of Aguascalientes